Jenkins Township is one of twenty-five townships in Barry County, Missouri, United States. As of the 2000 census, its population was 382.

Geography
It contains five cemeteries: Clio, Coones, Kane, Potter and Stubblefield.

The streams of Bailey Branch, Blacksmith Branch, Brantley Branch, Coon Creek, Jacks Branch and Jenkins Creek run through this township.

References

 USGS Geographic Names Information System (GNIS)

External links
 US-Counties.com
 City-Data.com

Townships in Barry County, Missouri
Townships in Missouri